The Gateway Western Railway  was a Class II railroad that operated 408 miles of former Chicago and Alton Railroad track between Kansas City and St. Louis, Missouri.  It also operated between Kansas City, Missouri, and Springfield, Illinois on the old Alton Railroad line that eventually was the Chicago, Missouri and Western Railway.

History
The Gateway Western Railway began operations on January 9, 1990 after purchasing the Kansas City to St. Louis right-of-way from the bankrupt Chicago, Missouri and Western Railway. Originally the Kansas City, St. Louis & Chicago, the line came under Chicago & Alton control in 1878, but never had much success under several operators of its line over the years, which included the Alton Railroad, Gulf, Mobile and Ohio Railroad from 1947 to 1972, and Illinois Central Gulf Railroad from 1972 to 1987. On April 28, 1987, Illinois Central Gulf, divesting itself of surplus lines to get itself down to a core system, sold the Kansas City line, and the Chicago (actually with ownership ending at Joliet, Illinois, then with trackage rights from there to Chicago via the Illinois Central Railroad) to East St. Louis mainline, to a new 633 mile regional, Chicago, Missouri and Western Railway.

In 1989, the Chicago, Missouri and Western Railway entered bankruptcy. The Atchison, Topeka and Santa Fe Railway (ATSF) had always wanted an access to St. Louis. Seeing an opportunity, Santa Fe arranged for a New York investment firm to purchase the Chicago, Missouri and Western Railway's Kansas City to St. Louis line, thus creating the Gateway Western Railway.  Santa Fe routed quite a bit of intermodal traffic via this routing during this period. However, by 1995, the Burlington Northern Railroad (BN) and the Santa Fe merged to form the Burlington Northern and Santa Fe Railway. With the BN already owning a St. Louis  line via a couple of routes already, less and less ATSF traffic was routed this way.

In 1997, the GWWR and its Illinois subsidiary Gateway Eastern Railway were purchased by Kansas City Southern (KCS).  The KCS operated the GWWR as a subsidiary until October 1, 2001, when it transferred its controlling interest to its own parent company and officially merged the GWWR into the KCS.  The Gateway Eastern, however, remained a KCS subsidiary.

References
 (February 2002), Flags fall in corporate shuffles, Trains Magazine, p. 17.

External links

Defunct Illinois railroads
Defunct Missouri railroads
Predecessors of the Kansas City Southern Railway
Former regional railroads in the United States
Railway companies established in 1990
Railway companies disestablished in 2001